Peconic may refer to:

Peconic, New York, a hamlet in Suffolk County, New York
Peconic Bay, two bodies of water between the North Fork and the South Fork of Long Island, New York
Great Peconic Bay, the body of water between the North Fork and the South Fork of Long Island, New York
Little Peconic Bay
Peconic Bay Medical Center, in Riverhead, New York
Peconic County, New York, a proposed new county in New York
Peconic River, a tributary of Peconic Bay in Suffolk County, New York
USS Peconic (AOG-68), a United States Navy ship